Tribune Bay Provincial Park is a provincial park located on Hornby Island in British Columbia, Canada. It features a broad, crescent-shaped beach of white sand, Tribune Bay (a shallow, warm-water bay), and spring wildflowers. There are opportunities for canoeing, fishing, hiking, tennis, picnicking and open water swimming. Six pit toilets are provided.

The bay (and hence the park) was named after , a ship stationed in British Columbia in 1859–1860 and 1864.

See also
Helliwell Provincial Park

References

External links
 
 commercial site

Provincial Parks of the Gulf Islands
Provincial parks of British Columbia
Bays of British Columbia
Beaches of British Columbia
Protected areas established in 1978